Maroilles may refer to:

 Maroilles, Nord, a commune in France
 Maroilles Abbey, a Benedictine abbey in Maroilles, Nord
 Maroilles cheese, a cheese made in Maroilles Abbey